The Americus Arrows was a short-lived baseball team based in Americus, Georgia.  In 2002 they were inaugural members of the Southeastern League of Professional Baseball. They played their home games in Americus, Georgia, at the Americus High School baseball stadium.

The Arrows would begin their season on the road against the Selma Cloverleafs on May 31, 2002, on opening night. The first home game would take place later that week on June 4. However, after only about 30 games the team was disbanded due to financial problems and low attendance. The team officially folded on July 2.

References
 AP Reports. (July 5, 2002) "Fledgling pro baseball team folds in Americus." The Associated Press State & Local Wire.
 Veach, Katherine. (June 4, 2002) "Nearly 2,000 attend homestand." The Selma Times-Journal.

Defunct independent baseball league teams
Professional baseball teams in Georgia (U.S. state)
Defunct baseball teams in Georgia
Baseball teams disestablished in 2002
Baseball teams established in 2002